Rosnob is a rural locality (a selo) in Saniortinsky Selsoviet, Tlyaratinsky District, Republic of Dagestan, Russia. The population was 285 as of 2010.

Geography 
Rosnob is located 12 km southeast of Tlyarata (the district's administrative centre) by road. Tsumilukh is the nearest rural locality.

References 

Rural localities in Tlyaratinsky District